José Prieto (born 24 April 1946) is a Spanish archer. He competed in the men's individual event at the 1984 Summer Olympics.

References

1946 births
Living people
Spanish male archers
Olympic archers of Spain
Archers at the 1984 Summer Olympics
Sportspeople from Huelva